Operation May Day was a series of entomological warfare (EW) tests conducted by the U.S. military in Savannah, Georgia in 1956.

Operation
Operation May Day involved a series of EW tests from April to November 1956. The tests were designed to reveal information about the dispersal of yellow fever mosquitoes in an urban area. The mosquitoes were released from ground level in Savannah, Georgia and then recovered using traps baited with dry ice. The operation was detailed in a partially declassified U.S. Army report in 1981.

See also
Human experimentation in the United States
Operation Big Buzz
Operation Big Itch
Operation Drop Kick

References

May Day
May Day
May Day
May Day
May Day
1956 in the United States
1956 in Georgia (U.S. state)